The Family Life Building on the Utah State University in Logan, Utah was built in 1935.  It was built as a Public Works Administration project, providing jobs during the Great Depression, and "to house the schools's Home Economics Department and all student union activities."  It was listed on the National Register of Historic Places as Home Economics/Commons Building in 1985.

It is a large two-story flat-roofed building, with narrow, recessed window panels and a crenelated parapet.  Transoms include zig-zag tracery. It was designed by architects Hodgson & McClenahan;  it was built by general contractor Soren Jacobsen of Logan.

It is Art Deco in style and was asserted to be "one of the best examples of the Art Deco architectural style in Utah."

It is known as the Family Life Building. It is located off U.S. Route 89 on the Utah State University campus.

References

National Register of Historic Places in Cache County, Utah
Art Deco architecture in Utah
Buildings and structures completed in 1935